Chittoor Mohammed Habeebullah was an Indian gastroenterologist, known for his contributions to the medical discipline of gastroenterology in India. Born in 1937 in the South Indian state of Andhra Pradesh, Habeebullah graduated in medicine (MBBS) from the Guntur Medical College in 1958, after which he secured his master's degree in general medicine (MD) from Andhra University and DM from the Post Graduate Institute of Medical Education and Research, Chandigarh. He started his career as an assistant professor at the Department of Gastroenterology, Osmania Medical College and served as the professor and the Head of the Department from 1975 to 1992 and thereafter as the principal till 1994. He also served as the Director, Centre for Liver Research and Diagnostics, Deccan College of Medical Sciences, Hyderabad and as the Director of Medical Education, Government of Andhra Pradesh. He was a 1997 Fellow of The National Academy of Sciences, India and had many scientific publications to his credit. A recipient of the Khwarizmi International Award in 1997, Habeebullah was honored by the Government of India, in 2001, with the fourth highest Indian civilian award of Padma Shri. He died on 10 July 2010, falling to a cardiac arrest.

See also

 Guntur Medical College
 Post Graduate Institute of Medical Education and Research
 Osmania Medical College
 Deccan College of Medical Sciences

References

External links
 

Recipients of the Padma Shri in medicine
People from Guntur district
1937 births
2010 deaths
Medical doctors from Andhra Pradesh
Indian gastroenterologists
Andhra University alumni
Academic staff of Osmania University
20th-century Indian medical doctors
Postgraduate Institute of Medical Education and Research alumni